Brower Airlines (initially known as Brower Airways) was a regional airline in the midwestern United States from 1969 to 1979. It was the only airline based in Iowa at the time. It was owned and operated by Alvin Brower, and used a small fleet of Cessna 402 aircraft. It was headquartered at Fort Madison Municipal Airport in Fort Madison.

Destinations
Brower served the following destinations:
Burlington, Iowa
Chicago (O'Hare), Illinois
Des Moines, Iowa
Fort Madison, Iowa
Jacksonville, Illinois
Keokuk, Iowa
Macomb, Illinois
Peoria, Illinois
Springfield, Illinois
St. Louis, Missouri

See also 
 List of defunct airlines of the United States

References

Defunct airlines of the United States
Defunct companies based in Iowa
Airlines established in 1968
Airlines disestablished in 1980
American companies established in 1968
American companies disestablished in 1980
Airlines based in Iowa